Gottlob Ludwig Rabenhorst (22 March 1806 – 24 April 1881) was a German botanist and mycologist.

Biography
Rabenhorst was born in Treuenbrietzen. He studied in Berlin and Belzig from 1822 to 1830, worked as a pharmacist in Luckau until 1840, and received his doctorate in Jena in 1841. From 1840, he lived in Dresden, relocating to nearby Meissen in 1875, where he died aged 75.

Renowned for his research of cryptogamic flora native to central Europe, his name is associated with Dr. L. Rabenhorst's Kryptogamen-Flora von Deutschland, Oesterreich und der Schweiz. Rabenhorst edited the scientific journal Hedwigia from 1852 to 1878. With Alexander Braun (1805–1877) and Ernst Stizenberger (1827–1895), he was editor of the exsiccata work Die Characeen Europas.

Works
 Rabenhorst, L. G. Deutschlands Kryptogamen-Flora oder Handbuch zur Bestimmung der kryptogamischen Gewächse Deutschlands, der Schweiz, des Lombardisch-Venetianischen Königreich und Istriens. Leipzig: E. Kummer. 1844–1848.
 Vol. 1. Pilze. 1844.
 Vol. 2. Div. 1. Lichenen. 1845.
 Vol. 2. Div. 2. Algen. 1847.
 Vol. 2. Div. 3.  Leber-, Laubmoose und Farrn. 1848.
 Dr. L. Rabenhorst's Kryptogamen-Flora von Deutschland, Oesterreich und der Schweiz. Zweite Auflage (2nd ed.). Available at Digital Library of the Royal Botanic Garden of Madrid. Some volumes were not published.
 Vol. 1. Die Pilze.
 Div. 1. Schizomyceten, Saccharomyceten und Basidiomyceten. Winter, G. 1880–1885.
 Div. 2. Ascomyceten: Gymnoasceen. Winter, G. 1884–1887.
 Div. 3. Ascomyceten: Hysteriaceen. Rehm, H. 1887–1896
 Div. 4. Phycomycetes. Fischer, A. 1892.
 Div. 5. Ascomyceten: Tuberaceen. Fischer, E. 1896–1897.
 Div. 6. Fungi imperfecti: Hyalin-sporige Sphaerioideen. Allescher, A. 1898–1903.
 Div. 7. Fungi imperfecti: Hyalin-sporige Sphaerioideen. Allescher, A. 1901–1903.
 Div. 8. Fungi imperfecti: Hyphomycetes. Lindau, G. 1904–1907.
 Div. 9. Fungi imperfecti: Hyphomycetes. Lindau, G. 1907–1910.
 Div. 10. Myxogasteres. Schinz, H. 1912–1920.
 Vol. 2. Die Meeresalgen. Hauck, F. 1882–1889.
 Vol. 3. Die Farnpflanzen. Luerssen, C. 1884–1889.
 Vol. 4. Die Laubmoose.
 Div. 1. Sphagnaceae. Limpricht, K.G. 1885–1889.
 Div. 2. Bryinae. Limpricht, K.G. 1890–1895.
 Div. 3. Hypnaceae und Nachträge. Limpricht, K.G.; Limpricht, H. 1895–1903.
 Ergänzungsband (Supplement). Die Laubmoose Europas. Andreales — Bryales. Mönkemeyer, W. 1927.
 Vol. 5. Die Characeen. Migula, W. 1895–1897.
 Vol. 6. Die Lebermoose 
 Div. 1. Lebermoose. Müller, K. 1905–1911.
 Div. 2. Lebermoose. Müller, K. 1912–1916.
 Vol. 7. Die Kieselalgen.
 Div. 1. Kieselalgen. Hustedt, F. 1930.
 Div. 2. Kieselalgen. Hustedt, F. 1931–1959.
 Div. 3. Kieselalgen. Hustedt, F. 1961–1966.
 Vol. 8. Flechtenparasiten. Keissler, K.v. 1930.
 Vol. 9. Die Flechten.
 Div. 1 (1). Moriolaceae — Epigloeaceae — Dermatocarpaceae. Keissler, K.v.; Zschacke, H. 1933–1934.
 Div. 1 (2). Pyrenulaceae — Mycoporaceae — Coniocarpineae. Keissler, K.v. 1937–1938.
 Div. 2 (1). Arthoniaceae — Coenogoniaceae. Redinger, K.M. 1937–1938.
 Div. 2 (2). Cyanophili. Köfaragó-Gyelnik, V. 1940.
 Div. 3. Lecidaceae, not published.
 Div. 4 (1). Cladoniaceae — Umbilicariaceae. Frey, E. 1932–1933.
 Div. 4 (2). Cladonia. Sandstede, H. 1931.
 Div. 5 (1). Acarosporaceae und Thelocarpaceae — Pertusariaceae. Magnusson, A.H.; Erichsen, C.F.E. 1934–1936.
 Div. 5 (3). Parmeliaceae. Hillmann, J. 	1936.
 Div. 5 (4). Usneaceae. Keissler, K.v. 1958–1960.
 Div. 6. Teloschistaceae — Physciaceae. Hillmann, J.; Lynge, B.A. 1935. Caloplacaceae — Buelliaceae, not published.
 Vol. 10. Flagellatae.
 Div. 1. Chrysophyceae, not published.
 Div. 2. Silicoflagellatae — Coccolithineae. Gemeinhardt, K.; Schiller, J. 1930.
 Div. 3 (1). Dinoflagellatae (Peridineae). Schiller, J. 1932–1933.
 Div. 3 (2). Dinoflagellatae (Peridineae). Schiller, J. 1935–1937.
 Div. 4. Cryptomonadales, Chloromonadales und Euglenales, not published.
 Vol. 11. Heterokonten. Pascher, A. 1937–1939.
 Vol. 12. Chlorophyceae
 Div. 1. Volvocales und Tetrasporales, not published.
 Div. 2. Protococcales, not published.
 Div. 3. Ulotrichales, not published.
 Div. 4. Oedogoniales. Gemeinhardt, K. 1938–1940.
 Div. 5. Siphonocladiales und Siphonales, not published.
 Vol. 13. Conjugatae.
 Div. 1 (1). Desmidiales: Desmidiaceen. Krieger, W. 1933–1937.
 Div. 1 (2). Desmidiales: Desmidiaceen. Krieger, W. 1939.
 Div. 2. Zygnemales. Kolkwitz, R.; Krieger, H. 1941–1944.
 Vol. 14. Cyanophyceae. Geitler, L. 1930–1932.
 Vol. 15. Not published.
 Rhodophyceae des Süsswassers. Schmidt, O. Ch. 
 Phaeophyceae des Süsswassers. Schmidt, O. Ch. 
 Allgemeines über das System — Generalregister.

See also
 :Category:Taxa named by Gottlob Ludwig Rabenhorst

References

Further reading

1806 births
1881 deaths
19th-century German botanists
German mycologists
People from the Margraviate of Brandenburg
People from Treuenbrietzen